Stephen Russell  is an American actor.

Stephen Russell may also refer to:

 Stephen Russell (cricketer) (born 1945), English cricketer and businessman
 Stephen Russell (1954 - 2020), Taoist practitioner known as the Barefoot Doctor
 Stephen Russell (MP), Member of Parliament (MP) for Melcombe Regis
 Stephen Russell (born 1964), Director-General of ANEC

See also 
 Steve Russell (disambiguation)
 Steven Jay Russell (born 1957), American con artist